Naomi E. Pierce (born 1954) is the Hessel Professor of Biology at Harvard University and a world authority on butterflies. Pierce is the university's Curator of Lepidoptera, a position once held by Vladimir Nabokov.

Pierce was a Fulbright Postdoctoral Fellow in Zoology from Harvard university to Griffith University in 1983, and a MacArthur Fellow in 1988 with Ecology and Evolutionary/Environmental Biology as area of focus. 

Pierce studies the relationship between butterfly larvae and ants, as well as the genetic trends within the species, in order to understand the process of evolution.

Pierce and collaborators Corrie Moreau and Charles D. Bell were the first to establish the origin of ants at 140 to 168 million years ago using molecular sequence data, 40 million years older than previous estimates.

Career
Pierce earned her BSc in Biology at Yale (1972–76) and her Ph.D. in Biology at Harvard (1977–83).

From 1984–86 she was Research Lecturer at Christ Church, Oxford and a NATO Research Fellow at Oxford's Department of Zoology.

In 1986 she moved to Princeton as Assistant (1986–89) and Associate (1989–90) Professor of Biology, and in 1991 was appointed Hessel Professor and Curator of Lepidoptera.

Awards, honors, and distinctions
In 2018, the entomopathogenic fungus Ophiocordyceps naomipierceae was named in her honor. 
In 2019, she was awarded the International Prize for Biology for her research in the evolution of insect symbioses

References

External links
 Pierce Laboratory at Harvard University

1954 births
Living people
Evolutionary biologists
Women evolutionary biologists
Harvard University alumni
Harvard University faculty
MacArthur Fellows
Women zoologists
Yale University alumni
Fellows of the American Academy of Arts and Sciences
American lepidopterists
Women entomologists